The 1965 FIBA European Championship, commonly called FIBA EuroBasket 1965, was the fourteenth FIBA EuroBasket regional basketball championship, held by FIBA Europe.

Venues

Results
First round

Group A – Moscow

Group B – Tbilisi

Places 13 – 16

Places 9 – 12

Places 5 – 8

Places 1 – 4

Finals

Final standings

Awards

Team rosters
Soviet Union: Gennadi Volnov, Modestas Paulauskas, Jaak Lipso, Armenak Alachachian, Aleksander Travin, Aleksander Petrov, Zurab Sakandelidze, Viacheslav Khrinin, Visvaldis Eglitis, Nikolai Baglei, Nikolai Sushak, Amiran Skhiereli (Coach: Alexander Gomelsky)
Yugoslavia: Radivoj Korać, Ivo Daneu, Petar Skansi, Slobodan Gordić, Trajko Rajković, Josip Đerđa, Nemanja Đurić, Vital Eiselt, Miloš Bojović, Dragan Kovačić, Zvonko Petričević, Dragoslav Ražnatović (Coach: Aleksandar Nikolić)
Poland: Mieczyslaw Lopatka, Bohdan Likszo, Andrzej Pstrokonski, Janusz Wichowski, Zbigniew Dregier, Kazimierz Frelkiewicz, Edward Grzywna, Wieslaw Langiewicz, Czeslaw Malec, Stanislaw Olejniczak, Andrzej Perka, Jerzy Piskun (Coach: Witold Zagórski)
Italy: Massimo Masini, Giambattista Cescutti, Ottorino Flaborea, Gabriele Vianello, Sauro Bufalini, Gianfranco Lombardi, Giusto Pellanera, Massimo Cosmelli, Franco Bertini, Guido Carlo Gatti, Sandro Spinetti (Coach: Carmine "Nello" Paratore)

References

External links
EuroBasket 1965 archive.fiba.com

International basketball competitions hosted by the Soviet Union
Euro
1965 in Soviet sport
1965
May 1965 sports events in Europe
June 1965 sports events in Europe
Sports competitions in Moscow
1965 in Moscow
Sports competitions in Tbilisi
1960s in Tbilisi